The following outline is provided as an overview of and topical guide to sharks:

Sharks (superorder Selachimorpha) are a type of fish with a full cartilaginous skeleton and a highly streamlined body. The earliest known sharks date from more than 440 million years ago, before the time of the dinosaurs.

Fields that study sharks 
Ichthyology – branch of zoology devoted to fish (including sharks)
Meristics – branch of ichthyology that relates to counting features of fish, such as the number of fins or scales

Description 
A shark, also called a "selachimorph", can be described as all of the following:

 Animal – multicellular, eukaryotic organism of the kingdom Animalia or Metazoa. An animal's body plan eventually becomes fixed as it develops, although some types of animal undergo a process of metamorphosis later on in their life. Most kinds of animal are motile, meaning they can move spontaneously and independently.
 Chordate – Chordates (phylum Chordata) are animals which are either vertebrates or one of several closely related invertebrates.
 Fish – gill-bearing aquatic vertebrate (or craniate) animal that lacks limbs with digits.
 Chondrichthye (cartilaginous fish) – jawed fish with paired fins, paired nares, scales, two-chambered hearts, and skeletons made of cartilage rather than bone.
 Elasmobranch – member of the subclass Elasmobranchii, which includes sharks, rays, and skates.
 Predator – organism that attacks and feeds on prey (the organism that is attacked).
 Apex predator – some shark species are apex predators, that is, predators with no predators of their own, residing at the top of their food chain.

Biological classification 

 Kingdom: Animalia
 Phylum: Chordata
 Class: Chondrichthyes
 Subclass: Elasmobranchii
 Superorder: Selachimorpha

Types of sharks 

List of sharks
Subdivisions of the biological classification Selachimorpha include:
 Carcharhiniformes – ground sharks
 Heterodontiformes – bullhead sharks
 Hexanchiformes – the five extant species of the most primitive types of sharks
 Lamniformes – mackerel sharks
 Orectolobiformes – includes carpet sharks, including zebra sharks, nurse sharks, wobbegongs, and the whale shark
 Pristiophoriformes – includes sawsharks
 Squaliformes – includes gulper sharks, bramble sharks, lantern sharks, rough sharks, sleeper sharks and dogfish sharks
 Squatiniformes – angel sharks
 † Cladoselachiformes
 † Hybodontiformes
 † Symmoriida
 † Xenacanthida (Xenacantiformes)

Shark behavior 

 Predation
 Apex predator
 Shark threat display – Behaviour shown by some sharks when threatened
 Spy hopping – Raising the head out of the water

Shark attacks 

Shark attack
 International Shark Attack File
 List of fatal, unprovoked shark attacks in the United States
 Jersey Shore shark attacks of 1916 – series of shark attacks along the coast of New Jersey between July 1 and July 12, 1916
 Summer of the Shark – the name given to the summer of 2001 by American media outlets capitalizing on a bull shark attack and subsequent shark attacks

Range and habitats of sharks

Range 
 Bodies of water in which sharks can be found include:
 Seas: all
 Freshwater – some species of shark can live both in seawater and freshwater, and include:
 Bull shark
 River shark
 Sandbar shark

Habitats 
 White Shark Cafe – remote mid-Pacific Ocean area noted as a winter and spring habitat of otherwise coastal great white sharks

Sharks in captivity 

Sharks in captivity
 Shark tank
 Shark tunnel – underwater tunnel that passes through an aquarium that keeps sharks

Shark anatomy 

 Physical characteristics of sharks – shark skeleton, respiration and skin
 Dermal denticle – small outgrowths which cover the skin of sharks
 Ampullae of Lorenzini – sensing organ that helps sharks and fish to sense electric fields
 Electroreception – the biological ability to perceive electrical impulses (see also Ampullae of Lorenzini)
 Lateral line – sense organ that detects movement and vibration in the surrounding water
 Shark cartilage – material that a sharks' skeleton is composed of
 Shark teeth
 Spiracle – pumps water across gills
 Clasper – the anatomical structure that male sharks use for mating
 Fish anatomy – generic description of fish anatomy

Protective equipment 

 Drum lines
 Shark net – submerged net placed around beaches to reduce shark attacks on swimmers
 Shark proof cage – cage from which a SCUBA diver can examine sharks more safely
 Shark repellent – method of driving sharks from an area, object, person, or animal
 Magnetic shark repellent – use of permanent magnets to repel sharks
 Protective oceanic device – first successful electronic shark repellent
 Shark suit

Shark fishing 

 Drivers of the shark trade
 Land-based shark fishing – fishing for sharks from land such as a beach, shoreline, jetty, pier, or bridge
 Shark finning – the removal of shark fins for commercial purposes

Shark conservation 

 1992 Cageless shark-diving expedition – first publicized cageless dive with great white sharks which contributed to changing public opinions about the supposed "killing machine"
 Shark Alliance – coalition of nongovernmental organizations dedicated to restoring and conserving shark populations by improving European fishing policy
 Shark Conservation Act – proposed US law to protect sharks
 Shark sanctuary – Palau's first-ever attempt to prohibit taking sharks within its territorial waters
 Shark tourism – form of ecotourism showcasing sharks
 Shark Trust – A UK organisation for conservation of sharks

Notable sharks 
 Stronsay Beast – large, dead creature washed ashore on Stronsay, in the Orkney Islands, after a storm in 1808, later presumed to be a basking shark

Notable researchers and people 

 Peter Benchley – author of the novel Jaws, later worked for shark conservation
 Eugenie Clark – American ichthyologist researching poisonous fish and the behavior of sharks; popularly known as The Shark Lady
 Leonard Compagno – international authority on shark taxonomy, best known for 1984 catalog of shark species (FAO)
 Jacques-Yves Cousteau – French naval officer, explorer, ecologist, filmmaker, innovator, scientist, photographer, author and researcher who studied the sea and all forms of life in water including sharks
 Ben Cropp – Australian former shark hunter, who stopped in 1962 to produce some 150 wildlife documentaries
 Richard Ellis – American marine biologist, author, and illustrator.
 Rodney Fox – Australian film maker, conservationist, survivor of great white shark attack and one of the world's foremost authorities on them
 Andre Hartman – South African diving guide best known for free-diving unprotected with great white sharks
 Hans Hass – diving pioneer, known for shark documentaries
 Mike Rutzen – great white shark expert and outspoken champion of shark conservation; known for free diving unprotected with great white sharks
 Ron & Valerie Taylor – ex-spearfishing champions who switched from killing to filming underwater documentaries
 Rob Stewart (filmmaker) – Canadian photographer, filmmaker and conservationist. He was best known for making and directing the documentary film Sharkwater

See also

 List of ichthyology terms
 List of megamouth shark specimens and sightings
 List of prehistoric cartilaginous fish genera
 List of sharks in the Red Sea

References

External links 

 Taxonomy of sharks and rays

sharks
sharks

Sharks